Vonray is the debut major label (Elektra Records) studio album by American rock band Vonray, released on April 8, 2003. This was Vonray's last released album. Vonray yielded the band's only success with the single "Inside Out".

Production and marketing
After three independent studio album releases and opening for many high-profile bands such as Third Eye Blind, Seven Mary Three and Creed, the band Vonray was signed to Elektra Records in late 2002. The band began working on an album which was produced by Marc Tanner, who worked with the likes of The Calling and Nelson. Promotion for the band was backed up by the band Creed and the album Vonray released in early 2003.

Singles
The first single released from Vonray was "Inside Out" in late 2002. The song received exposure due to being featured on the soundtrack album to the hit TV series Smallville. Two bandmembers appeared on the show itself performing the song acoustically. "Inside Out" experienced mild success in the United States and peaked at #32 on the Billboard Adult Top 40 chart and at #31 on Billboard's Top 40 Mainstream chart. The second single released for the album was "I'll Show You" around June 2003. The single received little promotion from the label and failed to chart. Due to the Elektra Records/Atlantic Records merger, promotion for the band all but ceased, and the band was dropped from the label soon after. Thus no more singles were released.

Music videos
A music video was produced for the single "Inside Out" and was directed by Kevin Lang and Hector Lopez. It was released on April 8, 2003. The video is a compilation of two live performances of "Inside Out". No music video was produced for "I'll Show You".

Track listing

Chart performance
Singles

Credits

Band
Vaughan Rhea: Vocals, Guitar
Dave Rhea: Baritone Guitar, Bass, Background Vocals
Garrett Coleman: Guitar, Background Vocals
Todd Hackenburg: Guitar
Jeff Irizarry: Drums

Production
Produced by Marc Tanner
Executive Producer: Jeff Hanson
Mixed by Chris Lord-Alge and Marc Greene
Recorded at  Cello Studios, Hollywood, CA & The Greene Room, Los Angeles, CA

Marketing and A&R
Management: Matt Alvers / Alvers Management & Promotions
Photography: Jelle Wagenaar

References

Vonray albums
2003 albums
Elektra Records albums